The 2020 Milano–Torino was the 101st edition of the Milano–Torino cycling classic. It was held on 5 August 2020 and was rated as a 1.Pro event on the 2020 UCI Europe Tour and 2020 UCI ProSeries. Unlike previous editions of the race, which were more suited for climbers and puncheurs, this year's edition was mostly flat and favored the sprinters.

Teams
Fourteen UCI WorldTeams, seven UCI ProTeams, and the Italian national team participated in the race. Of the 149 riders that started the race, only three did not finish.

UCI WorldTeams

 
 
 
 
 
 
 
 
 
 
 
 
 
 

UCI ProTeams

 
 
 
 
 
 
 

National Teams

 Italy

Results

References

Milano–Torino
Milano–Torino
Milano–Torino
Milano–Torino
Milano–Torino